The Berloque pistol is a tiny pistol. Made since 1905, this 4 cm miniature is one of the smallest handguns ever made.

References

External links
 berloque.com Official website

Pistols